John 20:24 is the twenty-fourth verse of the twentieth chapter of the Gospel of John in the New Testament. It contains the note that Thomas was absent when Jesus appeared for the first time to the disciples.

Content
The original Koine Greek, according to the Textus Receptus, reads:

In the King James Version of the Bible it is translated as:
But Thomas, one of the twelve, called Didymus, was not with them when Jesus came.

The modern World English Bible translates the passage as:
But Thomas, one of the twelve, called Didymus, wasn't with them when Jesus came.

For a collection of other versions see BibleHub John 20:24

Analysis
Thomas is mentioned here both in the Aramaic and Greek names, although he was mentioned previously in this gospel. The Greek word  means "twin" and also "double" or "twofold".

References

Sources

External links
Jesus Appears to His Disciples

20:24
John 20:24